Anna Sophia Berglund (born April 5, 1986) is an American actress, model, Playmate, and  reality show personality. She was Playmate of the Month for Playboy in January 2011. She was discovered originally by GXS Motorsports, where she spent two years as a promotional model. She went by the name Sophi Berglund until working for Playboy and resuming her original name.

Biography 
Berglund was born in San Pedro, California to parents of Swedish descent. She graduated from Palos Verdes Peninsula High School. She continued on to UCLA in 2008 and has studied acting at the Beverly Hills Playhouse.  She has a younger brother. She married Charlie O'Connell in 2018.

Filmography 
 
Berglund has made guest appearances in episodes of the television series Cavemen (2007), Desperate Housewives (2004) and Hannah Montana (2006), and she also had a small role in the comedy Fired Up! (2009).

References

External links

 
 

1986 births
Living people
2010s Playboy Playmates
Actresses from California
American people of Swedish descent
People from San Pedro, Los Angeles
Participants in American reality television series
UCLA Film School alumni
21st-century American women